Gerald B. Cleaver is a professor in the Department of Physics at Baylor University and is the Head of the Early Universe Cosmology and Strings (EUCOS) division of Baylor's Center for Astrophysics, Space Physics & Engineering Research (CASPER). His research specialty is string phenomenology and string model building.

Career

Gerald Cleaver did his Ph.D. at Caltech where John H. Schwarz was his thesis adviser. As a postdoc at Texas A&M University he worked with Dimitri Nanopoulos.

Research

With Dimitri Nanopoulos Cleaver constructed the first string-derived model containing only the particles of the Minimal Supersymmetric Standard Model (MSSM) in the observable sector.

At Baylor University Cleaver has constructed the first string derived Near-MSSM possessing the potential to resolve the factor-of-20 difference between the MSSM unification scale of 2.5×1025 eV (25 YeV or 4.0 MJ) and the weakly coupled heterotic string scale of 5×1026 eV (500 YeV or 80 MJ) via a robust method referred to as "optical unification".

References

External links
worldscinet.com
Cleaver's papers on SPIRES

21st-century American physicists
Living people
Baylor University faculty
Year of birth missing (living people)